Haideé Viviana Aceves Pérez (born 23 March 1993) is a Mexican Paralympic swimmer who competes in international swimming competitions. She is a Parapan American Games champion and five-time World bronze medalist, she has also competed at three Paralympic Games where her highest achievement was finishing in sixth place in the 50m freestyle S3 at the 2012 Summer Paralympics, she competed for Mexico at the 2016 and 2020 Summer Paralympics.

References

1993 births
Living people
Sportspeople from Guadalajara, Jalisco
Paralympic swimmers of Mexico
Mexican female freestyle swimmers
Mexican female backstroke swimmers
Swimmers at the 2012 Summer Paralympics
Swimmers at the 2016 Summer Paralympics
Swimmers at the 2020 Summer Paralympics
Medalists at the 2011 Parapan American Games
Medalists at the 2015 Parapan American Games
Medalists at the 2019 Parapan American Games
S3-classified Paralympic swimmers
20th-century Mexican women
21st-century Mexican women